The MV Ocean Trader (ex-Cragside) is a Special Warfare Support vessel operated by the United States Military Sealift Command.

The vessel has been proposed to serve as a special operations base for up to 200 troops, hangar bays for helicopters, gyms and weapons lockers.

History 
Between the years 2010 and 2011 the US Joint Special Operations Command operated a leased vessel off the coast of Somalia. Commanded by an officer from the US Navy, the vessel fell under the command of Task Force 484, the JSOC task force for the Horn of Africa and Yemen. Leased from the Edison Chouest Offshore firm, it reportedly had the capability to accommodate Navy SEALs, RHIBs and a helicopter. However, it reportedly focused mostly on collecting SIGINT equipment provided and operated by Navy SEALs. It is likely that the ship was a stopgap measure before a permanent ship, the Ocean Trader, could be acquired.

Cragside was launched by Odense Steel Shipyard in 2010, and completed in 2011 for Maersk Line.

In November 2013, Maersk was awarded a $73 million contract to convert the ship.

The US Navy's Request For Proposal called for a dual-screw ship capable of sustaining 20 knots speed with a range of 8000 miles, with 45 days endurance for a crew of 50 persons, augmented by a surge of up to 159 additional government personnel, and able to be refueled and re-provisioned underway for an additional 45 days' endurance for all 209 personnel. The vessel was to include capability to embark, hangar, launch and recover all rotary wing aircraft in the SOF inventory up to the size of the MH-53E, provide multiple refueling points for aircraft with a capacity for carrying 150,000 gallons of JP-5 fuel, carry and launch 4 boats of 12.3m length, two simultaneously within 20 minutes, and be able to carry, launch, and recover 8 jet skis and Zodiac inflatables. Modifications seen include a cavernous double hangar bay on the top deck forward of the bridge, and the conversion of the upper cargo deck immediately beneath the flight deck to handle the launch of boats. Unseen modifications were to include the addition of multiple dedicated maintenance and repair workshops for aircraft, UAVs, and small craft, dive lockers and service facilities for up to 60 NSWF personnel and their equipment, a 40 person SCIF, 20 person communications suite, berthing for at least 209 personnel, and emergency medical/surgical suite capable of accommodating at least 10 battle casualties. External FLIR monitoring and six 0.5inch machinegun pintle mounts for local security were also part of the upgrade. Numerous satellite antenna and communication masts are installed on the upper decks. All modifications included the requirement to operate in areas with ambient outside temperatures of 110 °F and sea temps of 95 °F. for extended periods in stationary location, indicating the Horn of Africa and waters contiguous to the Saudi Arabian peninsula would be the ship's primary area of deployment.

The ship was in service as of 2017, and was reported to have operated in the Mediterranean and Baltic Seas.

In January 2018, a photo of the ship was taken at the Al Duqm Port & Drydock in Oman.

It was more recently photographed docked in Victoria in the Seychelles.

References

2010 ships
Ships built in Odense
Ships of Denmark
Ships of the Maersk Line
Auxiliary ships of the United States